The Quraysh (Arabic: قريش) were a mercantile Arab tribe that historically inhabited and controlled Mecca and its Ka'aba.

Quraysh or Quraish may also refer to:

Quraysh (surah), the 106th chapter of the Quran
Quraish (video game), a 2005 real-time strategy 3D computer video game
Quraish Shihab (born 1944), an Arab Indonesian Muslim scholar 
Quraish Pur (Zulqarnain Qureshi, 1932–2013), Pakistani scholar and writer 
Quraish, Iran, or Koreshk, a village in South Khorasan Province

See also

Koreshk (disambiguation)
Qureshi, a Muslim family name